South Dakota Highway 40 (SD 40) is a state highway in southwestern part of the US state of South Dakota. The highway runs near Mount Rushmore National Memorial in Keystone, and its eastern terminus is on the Pine Ridge Indian Reservation near the edge of Badlands National Park.

Route description

SD 40 begins at an intersection with US 16A in Keystone and heads east through the town. It crosses Battle Creek numerous times, then leaves Keystone and heads in a general southeastern direction, curving regularly. The highway crosses Iron Creek just before leaving the Black Hills National Forest and crossing Battle Creek once more. It continues southeast, leaving Pennington County and entering Custer County. In Custer County, SD 40 meets SD 79, and the two highways run northward toward Hermosa. They straddle the western limit of Hermosa for a short distance before SD 79 continues north and SD 40 splits off to the east, passing through Hermosa. East of town, SD 40 curves back to the southeast and enters the Buffalo Gap National Grassland. Finally, the route curves to the south and crosses the Cheyenne River; doing this, it leaves the Buffalo Gap National Grassland and Custer County, and enters Oglala Lakota County and the Pine Ridge Indian Reservation, becoming BIA 41.

The route of SD 40 is defined in South Dakota Codified Laws § 31-4-161.

History
SD 40 was first established along the route from Rapid City to the Minnesota border southeast of Sioux Falls in 1926. The section east of near Philip was cosigned with US 16 when the U.S. Highway System was created. The SD 40 designation was dropped from the section east of Philip in 1927. SD 40 was rerouted southeast to east of Witten, replacing the part of SD 44. SD 40 became part of an extended SD 44 by 1975. SD 40 was established along its current route in 1976.

Major intersections

Related route

South Dakota Highway 40A (SD 40A) was a short spur route in the east part of Badlands National Park.  This route was originally part of SD 40. At that time, SD 40 exited the park to the northeast, and continued east with US 16. Around 1970, SD 40 was rerouted south from the park to a new alignment south of the White River. When this was done, SD 40A was created to link with US 16A.

In 1976, this route was redesignated as South Dakota Highway 377.

See also

References

External links

 South Dakota Highway 40 at The Unofficial South Dakota Highways Page

040
Transportation in Pennington County, South Dakota
Transportation in Custer County, South Dakota
Transportation in Oglala Lakota County, South Dakota
Black Hills